is a mountain of the Kiso Mountains and located on the border between Okuwa, Kiso District, and Iijima, Kamiina District, Nagano Prefecture, in the Chūbu region of Japan.

Gallery

External links
 Mount Akanagi at PeakVisor

Mountains of Nagano Prefecture